The Pennsylvania Geological Survey or Bureau of Topographic and Geologic Survey (BTGS), is a geological survey enacted by the Pennsylvania General Assembly "to serve the citizens of Pennsylvania by collecting, preserving, and disseminating impartial information on the Commonwealth's geology, geologic resources, and topography in order to contribute to the understanding, wise use, and conservation of its land and included resources."  The geological survey operates under the Pennsylvania Department of Conservation and Natural Resources.

History 
In total, four surveys have been conducted in the commonwealth.  The first survey was created in 1836, making it one of the oldest geological surveys in the United States.  It was followed by the Second Survey, which ran from 1874 to approximately 1895; and the Third Survey, which ran from 1910 to 1919. The fourth, and current, survey was created in 1919 and continues today.

Activities
The Survey has provided orthoimagery and digital topographic data derived from lidar through the PAMAP program. The Survey provides oil and gas well information through PA*IRIS. BTGS participates in federally funded StateMap program to produce 1:24000 geological maps.

References

External links
 Official web site

Geology of Pennsylvania
Geological surveys